Ann Lovett (6 April 1968 – 31 January 1984) was a 15-year-old schoolgirl from Granard, County Longford, Ireland who died giving birth beside a grotto on 31 January 1984. Her baby son died at the same time and the story of her death played a huge part in a seminal national debate on women giving birth outside marriage.

Events

In the afternoon of Tuesday, 31 January 1984 in Granard, County Longford, fifteen-year-old Ann Lovett left her Catholic Cnoc Mhuire Secondary School and made her way to a Grotto dedicated to the Virgin Mary at the top of her small hometown in the Irish midlands. It was here beneath the statue of Our Lady, that she gave birth, alone, to her infant son.

At around 4 pm that day some children on their way home from school saw Ann's schoolbag on the ground and discovered her lying in the Grotto.  They alerted a passing farmer who rushed to the nearby priest's house to inform him of the chilling discovery of Ann and her already deceased baby in the adjacent grotto. The priest's response to his request for help was;  "It's a doctor you need".

Ann, still alive but haemorrhaging heavily, was carried to the house of the parish priest from where a doctor was phoned. She was then driven in the doctor's car to her parents' house in the centre of the town. By the point an ambulance arrived it was already too late.

Ann Lovett and her child were quietly buried three days later in Granardkill cemetery.

Media reaction

On Saturday night, 4 February 1984, Ireland's most popular television show was coming to an end, when the host read this headline from the next day's Sunday Tribune newspaper: "Girl, 15, Dies Giving Birth In A Field".

With the words "Nothing terribly exciting there", the newspaper was cast down on the studio floor by the Late Late Show host, Gay Byrne.

This moment marked the first introduction the world had to the story of Ann Lovett and her newborn child.

A phonecall had been made to the Dublin newspaper by an anonymous caller from Granard and the story, broken in the Sunday Tribune by Emily O'Reilly, drew the attention of the world to the tragic incident. The next day Granard was swamped with national and international media.

The story shocked the nation and left many asking how such a thing could happen. For others it was an opportunity to finally reveal similar stories that had remained hidden for decades. The Gay Byrne Show on RTÉ Radio began to receive letters from all over the country – "Too many letters. They couldn't be ignored."

Local reaction
The local community and clergy, including the order of nuns at the school which Ann had attended remained tight lipped, apart from a terse statement, denying any knowledge of the teenager's pregnancy.

While the statement issued by the nuns, following legal advice, said they "did not know" about her pregnancy, they subsequently refused to confirm whether they had suspected it or not.

Rumours also abounded about the identity of the child's father and the difficult family circumstances in which Ann herself was reared.

Many residents of Granard accused the media of being overly intrusive and of wrongly attaching blame to the community for the tragedy.

In National Archives of Ireland documents released in December 2014, a letter was revealed written by the Roman Catholic Archdiocese of Armagh to poet Christopher Daybell which claimed Lovett's "sad death reflects more on her immaturity than on any lack of Christian charity".

Inquest and enquiries
An inquest was held in Mullingar a few weeks later and found that Ann's death was due to irreversible shock caused by haemorrhage and exposure during childbirth.

The inquest also confirmed that, contrary to claims emanating from the local community, some people did indeed know about Ann's pregnancy before her death.

Subsequent enquiries by the Gardaí, the Department of Education and the Midlands Health Board have yet to be published leaving the tragic events of that day and the circumstances that forced a young girl to leave her classroom on a cold, wet winters day to give birth alone in a grotto, still shrouded in uncertainty.

Aftermath
Ann Lovett's death came just four months after the outcome of a divisive abortion referendum in which a two-thirds majority voted to enshrine the right to life of the unborn in the constitution, creating confusion over where that left the rights of the mother.

In the ensuing public debate, the tragic events at Granard became symbolic of the emerging clash between church and state.

In the run-up to the 2018 Irish abortion referendum the case was again remembered.  After publishing an extensive piece in March 2018 retracing the facts of the case, on 5 May 2018 the Irish Times carried a detailed interview with Richard “Ricky” McDonnell, Ann Lovett's former boyfriend, coming forward for the first time and discussing the circumstances of their lives and their relationship. McDonnell stated that he first met Ann when he was 15 years old in her father's pub, The Copper Pot. She was 13 years old. They began a sexual relationship after she turned 14.

According to McDonnell, their close and loving relationship had foundered when Lovett had found it difficult to continue, after she had come to him one night in late April 1983, apparently having suffered a serious assault and beating. He told the Irish Times that Ann appeared to be distressed, showing him her thighs, which were marked with bruises and scrapes. Lovett then pleaded with McDonnell not to tell anybody. He asked Ann repeatedly if she had been raped, to which she did not reply.

In October of that year, McDonnell explained that he became aware of the rumours around Granard that Ann was pregnant, and confronted her with his doubts. She denied categorically that she was pregnant, laughing it off, and said she’d just put on a bit of weight.

According to McDonnell, immediately following Ann’s funeral, Lovett’s mother and sister gave him a letter, which had been found addressed to him among Ann’s possessions. The alleged letter, written by Ann, on two sheets of paper, explained that she had loved him dearly, and was sorry for doing what she was going to do; the reason being that nobody would believe he was the father of her child. McDonnell concluded that Ann, being strong willed and intelligent, went the grotto alone to have the baby for a reason, in a deliberate act of “protest”.

McDonnell alleged that Granard priest, Fr Quinn, upon learning of the letter, demanded to read it, and then told McDonnell to burn it because it would destroy the town if its contents became known. According to Mcdonnell, another letter written by Ann, which was unaddressed, had also been found among her things, its opening line described by one of Ann's friend who had read it as “If I’m not dead by the 31st of January, I’m going to kill myself anyway”.

McDonnell further told The Irish Times, that at the request of Granard gardaí, McDonnell's mother was to escort him be interviewed by local authorities. However, when he gave his statement to Detective John Murren, he was allegedly alone and unaccompanied by guardian or legal counsel. According to McDonnell, Fr Quinn then brought him to the palace of Dr Colm O'Reilly, then Bishop of Ardagh and Clonmacnoise, who wanted to know what he had told the police. O’Reilly, was alleged to have ordered him to kiss his ring, describing it as the seal of St Peter, and swore him to a vow of silence. Bishop O'Reilly told The Irish Times in a statement he had never met McDonnell.

McDonnell did not know for sure whether the child Ann had borne had been his, but he had lived with the tragic outcome for the rest of his life.

Documentaries
Twelve years after Ann's death, Lorelei Harris, a producer on the Gay Byrne programme, decided to make a radio documentary on the letters sent to the show in the immediate aftermath of the Granard tragedy.

She sought the opinions of local people on the pregnancy and death of Ann Lovett. Journalists and broadcasters also talked about their experiences at the time. Contributors to this documentary include Emily O'Reilly, Kevin O'Connor and people from Granard. The "Letters to Ann" were read by Aidan Matthews and John MacKenna, with Ann-Marie Horan reading from the original Gay Byrne show letters.

Artistic response

 In October 1987, Cry Before Dawn released a song titled "Girl in the Ghetto", which had been written as "Girl in the Grotto". It is a reflection on the Ann Lovett story.
 "Middle of the Island", by Christy Moore, from his 1989 album Voyage, is another song examining the society in which Ann Lovett lived and how she could have died in such circumstances. The song also appears in the Christy Moore Box Set under the title "Ann Lovett" and has also appeared on the Traveller album from 1999, where it was used to introduce "The Well Below The Valley", recorded live at Glastonbury festival. 
 In 2014, a song and video were released by Jj Kikola entitled "(They Were) Deaf To Her Child's Cries". The song is written in memory of Ann and her child, and was released two weeks before the 30th anniversary of the tragedy. Kikola, in a subsequent interview cited his inspiration for writing the song, as being the fact that the event has been largely unknown to the younger generation in Ireland.
 The 2006 novel A Swift Pure Cry by Irish author Siobhan Dowd was partially inspired by Ann Lovett's death.
 The 2015 Poetry Competition "A Poem for Ireland" shortlisted the 1991 Paula Meehan poem "The Statue of the Virgin at Granard Speaks" which references the death of Ann Lovett.

References

External links

1968 births
1984 deaths
People from County Longford
Deaths in childbirth
Teenage pregnancy